The 1964–65 NCAA University Division men's ice hockey season began in November 1964 and concluded with the 1965 NCAA University Division Men's Ice Hockey Tournament's championship game on March 20, 1965 at the Meehan Auditorium in Providence, Rhode Island. This was the 18th season in which an NCAA ice hockey championship was held and is the 71st year overall where an NCAA school fielded a team.

The ECAC conference was nearly halved before the season, going from 29 teams the previous year down to 15. This happened due to the creation of a lower-tier division for the schools that couldn't afford or weren't willing to compete with the wealthier universities. The lower tier would go through several changes over the years but continues to operate as the Division III level as well as the lone remaining Division II conference, Northeast-10. (as of 2016)

Regular season

Season tournaments

Standings

1965 NCAA Tournament

Note: * denotes overtime period(s)

Player stats

Scoring leaders
The following players led the league in points at the conclusion of the season.

GP = Games played; G = Goals; A = Assists; Pts = Points; PIM = Penalty minutes

Leading goaltenders
The following goaltenders led the league in goals against average at the end of the regular season while playing at least 33% of their team's total minutes.

GP = Games played; Min = Minutes played; W = Wins; L = Losses; OT = Overtime/shootout losses; GA = Goals against; SO = Shutouts; SV% = Save percentage; GAA = Goals against average

Awards

NCAA

ECAC

WCHA

See also
 1964–65 NCAA College Division men's ice hockey season

References

External links
College Hockey Historical Archives
1964–65 NCAA Standings

 
NCAA